Lasiolaena is a genus of Brazilian flowering plants in the family Asteraceae.

 Species 
All the known species are native to the State of Bahia in eastern Brazil.

References

Asteraceae genera
Eupatorieae
Endemic flora of Brazil